Capricornia may refer to:

Places 
 Capricornia, Queensland, a region of the coast located around Rockhampton, Queensland
 Division of Capricornia, an electoral district in the Australian House of Representatives based around the region
 Capricornia, a proposed new Australian State based in northern Queensland

Other uses 
 Capricornia (album), a 2002 album by Midnight Oil
 Capricornia (genus), a genus of moths
 Capricornia (novel), a 1938 novel by Australian author Xavier Herbert, set in the Northern Territory
 "Capricornia", a song by the band Allo Darlin' from their album Europe